The Trinity Foundation based in Unicoi, Tennessee in the United States is a Calvinist think tank and apologetics organization founded in 1977 and headed by John W. Robbins.

The foundation publishes reprints of the writings of Gordon Clark, as well as other books, lectures, essays, and a monthly newsletter. It also hosts conferences and seminars.

References

External links
Trinity Foundation 
Trinity Foundation - lecture series

Foundations based in the United States
Think tanks based in the United States
Unicoi County, Tennessee
Organizations established in 1977
Calvinist organizations established in the 20th century